The  is a Shinto shrine in Togakushi, Nagano (city), Nagano Prefecture, Japan. The shrine is at the base of Mount Togakushi in Myōkō-Togakushi Renzan National Park. Togakushi Shrine consists of five shrines, known as the lower, middle, and upper shrine area (Togakushi Hōkō-sha, Hino-miko-sha, Togakushi Chū-sha, Togakushi Oku-sha and Kuzuryu-sha respectively), each area about 2 km apart.

The approach to the upper shrine is lined with over 300 Cryptomeria trees, some believed up to 900 years old.

Kuzuryu means nine-headed dragon. The dragon is calling for rain, and Togakushi village has abundant spring water from mountains.

 The Hōkō-sha (lower shrine) is to a patron goddess, protecting maternity, academic life, and sewing
 The Hino-miko-sha is God of fire and the performing arts
 The Chū-sha (middle shrine) is God of wisdom
 The Oku-sha (upper shrine) is God's marvelous threw rocks
 The Kuzuryu-sha is God of rain and landowner God of Togakushi villages

Around five shrine and pilgrimage certification seal gosyuin to make things possible.

History
In one theory, the upper shrine, or Oku-sha, is said to have been first constructed in the 5th year of the Emperor Kogen (210 BC) while Buddhist tradition holds that a monk named Gakumon discovered the Oku-sha area and began the practice of Shugendo there in the 2nd year of the Kasha era (849 AD).  According to the Nihon-Shoki, the Emperor Tenmu had a map of the area made in 684 AD and a temporary building built the following year.

Togakushi shrine was a pilgrimage site during the following eight centuries. Its name was ranked with the Ise-jingu Shrine, Koya-san Temple and Enryaku-ji temples. Togakushisan Kansyuin Kenkou-ji was the formal name of the Togakushi Temple.

Two major esoteric Buddhist sects, Shingon and Tendai fought for the hegemony of Togakushi Temple. Eventually the Shingon sect lost the battle. Togakushi Temple was changed to a shrine by the Meiji government's Buddhism/Shinto separation initiatives "Shinbutsu bunri", "Haibutsu kishaku", and the 1868 Temple Ordinance. Until that time, it was common in Japan for the same buildings to be used as both temples (Buddhist) and shrines (Shinto). Until the 19th century, Buddhist activities at the Togakushi Temple were dedicated to "Avalokiteśvara".

Site 
Upon arrival at Togakushi it is recommended to first visit Oku-sha and then Kuzuryu-sha. It is a 2 kilometer hike from the entrance to the two shrines, however the path leading deep into the mountain can only be taken on foot. Beyond the cedar-lined path, you will be able to see the torii gate for Oku-sha at the bottom of the mountain and the shaden main building of the shrine as well. During winter the paths are closed but snowshoeing may be possible.

See also 
 List of Shinto shrines in Japan
 Modern system of ranked Shinto Shrines

References

External links

 戸隠神社 (Togakushi-jinja) website
 Togakushi-shrine's Pilgrimage stamp. gensyoushinokioku in Japanese
 Togakushi Village | Togakushi Shrine in English

Shinto shrines in Nagano Prefecture
Beppyo shrines